The Geneva Red Birds were a Minor league baseball team based in Geneva, Alabama, that played in the Alabama State League from 1946 to 1950.

External links
Baseball Reference

Geneva County, Alabama
Baseball teams established in 1946
Baseball teams disestablished in 1950
Defunct minor league baseball teams
Professional baseball teams in Alabama
Defunct Alabama State League teams
St. Louis Cardinals minor league affiliates
Boston Red Sox minor league affiliates
1946 establishments in Alabama
1950 disestablishments in Alabama
Defunct baseball teams in Alabama
Alabama State League teams